Lac La Loche is a lake in north west Saskatchewan near the Alberta border. The lake is part of the Churchill River system that flows into the Hudson Bay. The La Loche River at the southern end flows into Peter Pond Lake which is connected to Churchill Lake.

Settlements on the lake include La Loche and Clearwater River (CRDN) on the eastern shore and Black Point on the southern shore. The estimated population of the three settlements in 2012 was 3500 people.

The 19 kilometre Methye Portage or Portage La Loche at the northern end of the lake leads to the Clearwater River. The Portage a National Historic Site is also part of the Clearwater River Provincial Park.

History 

Fur trade posts were built on Lac La Loche soon after Peter Pond came through the Methye Portage in 1778. An early indication of settlement comes from George Back who in 1822 noted in his journal: "We touched at the houses on the borders of the lake and embarked a man in each canoe".

John Franklin's Coppermine expedition map of 1819-1820 shows Lac La Loche as Methye Lake and the La Loche River as the Methye River. Both names for the lake and the river were in use at this time. George Back who accompanied Franklin used Lac La Loche, La Loche River and Lac La Loche House (the Hudson Bay Post) in his journal. Alexander Mackenzie in "Voyages from Montreal" used both Portage la Loche and Mithy-Ouinigam Portage (in 1789-1793).

Fish Species
The lake's fish species include: walleye, sauger, yellow perch, northern pike, lake trout, lake whitefish, cisco, white sucker, longnose sucker and burbot.

See also
List of lakes of Saskatchewan

References

La Loche
Fur trade